National Renewal Movement (in Spanish: Movimiento de Renovación Nacional), was a political party in Peru. It was founded by Julio Bedoya Villacorta in 1947.

Political parties established in 1947
Defunct political parties in Peru
1947 establishments in Peru